The Atlantic and Western Railway  is a Class III short-line railroad operating about  of track in Lee County, North Carolina.  Atlantic and Western is part of Genesee & Wyoming Inc. and formerly part of Rail Management and Consulting. It was reorganized in 1927 from the Atlantic and Western Railroad.

History 
Originally the A&W ran between Sanford and Lillington, 25 miles. In 1961, the line was abandoned except for 3 miles from Sanford eastward. In the 1970s, the ATW's fleet of modernized 40-foot boxcars in food lading service were some of the last 40' boxcars in revenue service in the United States. In 2001 the A&W began operating between Sanford and Cumnock over a line that was originally a segment of the Cape Fear and Yadkin Valley Railway and subsequently Southern Railway and Norfolk Southern. In 2011, Norfolk Southern granted the A&W additional rights to serve customers between Cumnock and Brickhaven over the original Norfolk Southern Railway.

Interchanges 
Sanford, North Carolina
CSX Transportation (CSXT)
Norfolk Southern (NS)

Further reading

External links 

Atlantic and Western Railway (Genesee & Wyoming website)
Railway Association of North Carolina - ATW
American Short Line & Regional Railroad Association: ATW
Abandonment History
Rail Map of North Carolina
Records of the City of Sanford

North Carolina railroads
Railway companies established in 1927
Genesee & Wyoming
1927 establishments in North Carolina
American companies established in 1927